Hannah Muller (born 1999) is a South African water polo player.

She was a member of the South Africa women's national water polo team at the 2020 Tokyo Summer Olympics, where they ranked 10th.

Career statistics

References 

Living people
1999 births
South African female water polo players
Olympic water polo players of South Africa
Water polo players at the 2020 Summer Olympics
20th-century South African women
21st-century South African women